Pogled is a small settlement in the Municipality of Apače in northeastern Slovenia.

References

External links 
Pogled on Geopedia

Populated places in the Municipality of Apače